James Lawrence Smith (May 15, 1895 – January 1, 1974) was a Major League Baseball infielder often referred to as "Greenfield Jimmy" or "Bluejacket".

Smith was a switch hitter and threw right-handed. His major league debut came on September 26, 1914, with the Chicago Chi-Feds. In 1919, he won the World Series with the Cincinnati Reds, and he went on to play his final game with the Philadelphia Phillies on September 3, 1922.

During Prohibition, Smith smuggled bootlegged alcohol from various cities into his Greenfield neighborhood. He is buried in Calvary Cemetery in Pittsburgh.

Family
Smith had four children: Mary Louise, Jimmy Jr., Nora, and Tommy. Jimmy Jr. played baseball for the University of Pennsylvania, and some professional baseball in the minor leagues with the Gladewater Bears, a team in the Texas League. Tommy played basketball at Pennsylvania and then attended the Wharton school of business. Jimmy Jr. had a son, Jimmy Smith III, who was an All-Ivy League football player at the University of Pennsylvania. Jimmy Smith III signed a contract to play with the Pittsburgh Steelers in 1983 but was released after a knee injury.

Smith was the father-in-law of world light heavyweight champion Billy Conn. A rematch against Joe Louis in 1942 had to be abruptly canceled after Conn broke his hand in a much-publicized fight with Smith.

Smith's great-granddaughter is swimmer Leah Smith.

References

External links

1895 births
1974 deaths
Major League Baseball infielders
Chicago Whales players
Baltimore Terrapins players
Pittsburgh Pirates players
New York Giants (NL) players
Boston Braves players
Duquesne Dukes baseball players
Cincinnati Reds players
Philadelphia Phillies players
Indianapolis Indians players
Jersey City Skeeters players
Baseball players from Pittsburgh
Burials at Calvary Catholic Cemetery (Pittsburgh)